Oli 96.8FM is an infotainment radio station in the Tamil language owned by Mediacorp playing for the Indian community in Singapore, offering the latest Tamil songs, regional Indian songs, local & international news, lifestyle features and Indian contemporary & classical hits, 24 hours a day. It used to be the only station in Singapore where all of its shows were presenter-led, especially during the early hours. This has since changed as it airs non-stop music and podcasts of earlier aired programs after 0100hours on weekdays while non-stop music airs uninterrupted on weekends.

The programmes on Oli 968 as of 2023 include Vanakkham Singai with Kather and Vimala on mornings,Tea Kadai with Rafi and Ravi G on afternoons.

It provides Tamil news and information programs and broadcasts Tamil songs.

It is one of the nation's oldest stations, tracing its origins back to the beginning of regulated radio broadcasting in Singapore/Straits Settlements along with Gold 905, Warna 94.2FM and Capital 95.8FM on 1 June 1936.

On 7 June 2014, Oli 96.8FM launched their new logo at Bukit Panjang Plaza.

Directoral and Management
 Music Director: Shuai Aola

References

External links 
Oli 96.8FM Official Website
Oli 96.8 FM Listen Now Online

Radio stations in Singapore
Tamil-language radio stations
Radio stations established in 1965